Paolo Pasquale Peschisolido (born 25 May 1971), commonly known as Paul Peschisolido, is a Canadian soccer former manager and player. Peschisolido was manager of English League Two club Burton Albion from May 2009 until March 2012.

A forward, Peschisolido began his career in the Canadian Soccer League with the Toronto Blizzard and played in the Major Indoor Soccer League with the Kansas City Comets before moving to England.

Over 16 seasons he scored 118 goals from 447 appearances in the Football League, playing for nine different clubs: Birmingham City, Stoke City, West Bromwich Albion, Fulham, Queens Park Rangers, Sheffield United, Norwich City, Derby County and Luton Town.

Peschisolido represented his country from U-16 level upwards to the senior level spanning from 1986 to 2004, making his senior debut for the Canadian national team in 1992. He went on to play 53 times for Canada, scoring 10 goals, in a 12-year senior international career. On 1 June 2013, he was inducted into the Canadian Soccer Hall of Fame.

Club career

Early years
Peschisolido was born in Scarborough, now part of Toronto, Ontario. He began his professional playing career when still a high-schooler with Archbishop Denis O'Connor Catholic High School in Ajax.  Peschisolido led the team to OFSAA finals in his last year then moved on as a trainee with the Toronto Blizzard of the Canadian Soccer League, where he was named the "Rookie of the Year" in 1989. He also played the 1990–91 Major Indoor Soccer League season with the Kansas City Comets, being named the league's 'Newcomer of the Year'.

Birmingham City
After spending a year with the Juventus academy, returning homesick saw him offered the opportunity from his former national youth team coach Tony Taylor to join Birmingham City for £25,000 in November 1992. He was joint top scorer in each of his two seasons with the club.

Stoke City
In August 1994, he moved on to Stoke City in a £400,000 plus player exchange deal involving Dave Regis. He was top scorer with 15 goals for the 1994–95 season, and remained at Stoke until March 1996, when he returned to Birmingham until the end of the 1995–96 season, scoring once in nine appearances.

West Bromwich Albion
Peschisolido signed for West Bromwich Albion in a £600,000 deal in July 1996. He made his first appearance for the club in the 3–1 home League Cup defeat to Colchester United on 3 September 1996. Four days later, Peschisolido scored just nine minutes into his Albion league debut, as the Midlands side ran out 2–0 winners at Queens Park Rangers. He was joint top League scorer that season for the club.

Fulham
After 51 appearances and 21 goals for West Brom, he dropped down a division to join Fulham in October 1997, for a £1.1 million transfer fee. He appeared 37 times for 'the Cottagers' in the 1997–98 season, scoring 13 goals and helping the team win promotion as Division Two champions. In the next two seasons, he produced 10 goals from 40 appearances and 7 from 36 appearances in all competitions.

After appearing in two League Cup matches for Fulham in the 2000–01 season, Peschisolido was loaned to Queens Park Rangers in November 2000. He scored on his QPR debut, playing alongside the much taller Peter Crouch in a 1–1 draw against Portsmouth. In January 2001, he went on loan again, this time to Sheffield United, also scoring on his debut for "the Blades", before spending a further loan period at Norwich City.

Sheffield United
He later re-joined Sheffield United in a permanent deal for £250,000, after agreeing to a wage cut. He was a key player in the 2002–03 season, helping the club reach the semi-finals of the 2003 FA Cup and League Cup and the Division One play-off final. In the play-off semi-final against Nottingham Forest, Sheffield United came back from a two-goal deficit to take the game into extra time. Peschisolido came off the substitutes' bench at the midpoint of added time to score the goal that took the lead, which is remembered not just for its impact on the game but also for the player's frantic celebrations afterwards. In the 2003 FA Cup semi-final against Arsenal, he was denied an equalising goal by goalkeeper David Seaman, who made a one-handed "claw-back" save from Peschisolido's header which three-time Best European Goalkeeper Peter Schmeichel later described as "the best stop I’ve ever seen in the flesh".

Derby County
In March 2004, Peschisolido joined Derby County in a swap deal, with Izale McLeod moving to United on loan for the rest of the season. Once again he scored on debut, contributing four goals in his first three appearances, including two  against local rivals Nottingham Forest, one of which was gifted to him by goalkeeper Barry Roche, who sliced an attempted clearance after the ball deflected off a plastic coffee cup on the pitch. After Derby avoided relegation in 2004, Peschisolido's "knack for scoring vital goals from the substitutes' bench" helped them reach the playoffs in 2005 and 2007, though he started in the playoff final against West Bromwich Albion at Wembley Stadium, which Derby won 1–0 to earn promotion to the Premier League. Peschisolido was released by the club at the end of that season.

Luton Town
On 16 July 2007 Peschisolido signed for Luton Town on a one-year deal. He played just four league matches and one cup match for Luton, scoring once in the Football League Trophy against Northampton Town, before an ankle problem kept him out of action from September onwards. After the injury failed to respond to injections it was confirmed in December that he would require an operation, ruling him out for the rest of the season. Luton released Peschisolido at the end of the 2007–08 season, following their relegation to League Two. Failing to fully recover from injury, he would subsequently retire and not seek a new club.
By this time, he had accumulated 447 Football League appearances and 118 goals over 16 years, predominantly in the second tier of English professional football. He also made 76 cup appearances, scoring 22 goals.

International career
Peschisolido played in all of Canada's three games at the 1987 FIFA U-16 World Championship which were held in Canada. He earned 7 caps at the U-17 level, 6 caps at the U-20 level scoring 2 goals, and 12 caps at the U-23 level scoring 5 goals.

He made his senior national team debut for Canada on 13 June 1992 in a match against Hong Kong at Varsity Stadium where he scored his first international goal. Peschisolido formed effective striker partnerships for Canada with Alex Bunbury and Carlo Corazzin over their years with the national team. Peschisolido scored the majority of his international goals between 1995 and 1996 at Commonwealth Stadium that included a number of World Cup qualification matches which led to the venue becoming lovingly nicknamed St. Paul's Cathedral amongst the Canadian fans and press.
He scored his last international goal on his 50th cap on 13 June 2004 in a World Cup qualification match against Belize, exactly 12 years to the day from his first international goal and first cap. He earned a total of 53 caps from 1992 to 2004, and scored 10 goals making him tied 9th with Tomasz Radzinski in all-time scoring for Canada. He represented Canada in four FIFA World Cup qualification campaigns (1994, 1998, 2002, and 2006) in 26 FIFA World Cup qualification matches He played in the Canadian squad that won the 2000 CONCACAF Gold Cup and played in all of Canada's three games at the 2001 FIFA Confederations Cup.  His final international cap was on 4 September 2004 at Commonwealth Stadium in a World Cup qualification match against Honduras.

Managerial career
On 15 January 2009, he was appointed as Jeff Kenna's assistant manager at League of Ireland club St Patrick's Athletic. Both Kenna and Peschisolido registered as players for the 2009 season in case of emergency. On 15 May 2009, he resigned from this post for "personal reasons" with immediate effect.

Three days later, on 18 May 2009, he was appointed manager of Burton Albion taking over from caretaker manager Roy McFarland, who had taken the club to promotion to League Two after the departure of Nigel Clough. Peschisolido was in charge of Burton for almost 3 years but was relieved of his duties on 17 March 2012, following a winless run of 14 games.

Personal life
In 1995, Peschisolido married Karren Brady, who was at the time managing director of Birmingham City F.C. The couple have two children, daughter Sophia and son Paolo. Peschisolido is a cousin of former National Hockey League (NHL) player Mike Ricci.

Career statistics

Club
Source:

International
Source:

International goals
Scores and results list Canada's goal tally first.

Managerial statistics

.

Honours

Club

Fulham
Football League Second Division
Winners: 1998-99

Derby County
Football League Championship playoff winners: 2006–07

International
Canada
CONCACAF Gold Cup: 
Winners: 2000

Individual
Canadian Soccer League Rookie of the Year: 1989
Canadian Soccer League All-Star Team: 1990
Canadian Soccer League  All-Star team: 1992
Major Indoor Soccer League Newcomer of the Year: 1991
Canadian Player of the Year: 1996
 Canadian Soccer Hall of Fame: 2013

Notes
A.  Soccerbase's stats for the match between Derby County and Birmingham City on 9 March 2007 fail to include appearances by substitutes for either side, one of whom was Peschisolido. Therefore, until and unless they correct it, he should have one more appearance for Derby than given on his Soccerbase page.

References

External links

 A November 2004 BBC Derby profile of Peschisolido
 / Canada Soccer Hall of Fame
 Career information at ex-canaries.co.uk
 

1971 births
Living people
Canadian people of Italian descent
Canadian emigrants to England
Soccer players from Toronto
Sportspeople from Scarborough, Toronto
Association football forwards
Canadian soccer players
Canada Soccer Hall of Fame inductees
Canada men's youth international soccer players
Canada men's under-23 international soccer players
Canada men's international soccer players
CONCACAF Gold Cup-winning players
1993 CONCACAF Gold Cup players
2000 CONCACAF Gold Cup players
2001 FIFA Confederations Cup players
Canadian expatriate soccer players
Canadian expatriate sportspeople in the United States
Kansas City Comets (original MISL) players
Toronto Blizzard (1986–1993) players
Birmingham City F.C. players
Stoke City F.C. players
West Bromwich Albion F.C. players
Fulham F.C. players
Queens Park Rangers F.C. players
Sheffield United F.C. players
Norwich City F.C. players
Derby County F.C. players
Luton Town F.C. players
Expatriate soccer players in the United States
Expatriate footballers in England
Canadian Soccer League (1987–1992) players
Major Soccer League players
Canadian soccer coaches
Burton Albion F.C. managers
English Football League managers
English Football League players
Spouses of life peers
Canadian expatriate sportspeople in England